Gustaf Olof Falhem Kilman (9 July 1882 – 21 February 1946) was a Swedish Army officer and horse rider who competed in the 1912 Summer Olympics and in the 1920 Summer Olympics.

In 1912 he and his horse Gåtan (The riddle) were part of the Swedish equestrian team, which won the gold medal in the team jumping. Eight years later he finished 15th in the individual jumping event with his horse Irving.

Kilman was a captain in the Swedish Army. He committed suicide by shooting himself in Gothenburg in 1946.

References

External links 
 profile

1882 births
1946 suicides
Swedish Army officers
Swedish male equestrians
Swedish show jumping riders
Olympic equestrians of Sweden
Equestrians at the 1912 Summer Olympics
Equestrians at the 1920 Summer Olympics
Olympic gold medalists for Sweden
Olympic medalists in equestrian
Medalists at the 1912 Summer Olympics
Suicides by firearm in Sweden